This is a list of ants in the genus Brachymyrmex. , Brachymyrmex contains 44 species and 17 subspecies.

Species

References 

Brachymyrmex